Electronic Musician is a monthly magazine published by Future US featuring articles on synthesizers, music production and electronic musicians.

History and profile
Electronic Musician began as Polyphony magazine in 1975, published by PAiA Electronics as a synthesizer hobbyist magazine. In 1976 it was spun off as a separate company, Polyphony Publishing Company. It was sold to Mix Publications in 1985. Mix Publications was bought by Act III Communications around 1989, which in the 1990s was bought by Primedia. Primedia's business magazines were spun off as Prism Business Media in 2005; Prism merged with Penton Media the next year. NewBay Media bought the magazine in 2011. EQ Magazine was merged into Electronic Musician in May 2011. Future acquired NewBay in 2018. The headquarters is in San Bruno, California.

References

External links
Official website

1975 establishments in California
Hobby magazines published in the United States
Monthly magazines published in the United States
Music magazines published in the United States
Magazines established in 1975
Magazines published in California